This is the list of awards and nominations received by the television series Samantha Who? (2007–2009).

By Awards

BMI Film and TV Awards
2008: BMI TV Music Award (Jan Stevens, won)

Emmy Awards
2008: Outstanding Lead Actress in a Comedy Series (Christina Applegate for playing Samantha Newly, nominated)
2008: Outstanding Supporting Actress in a Comedy Series (Jean Smart for playing Regina Newly, won)
2009: Outstanding Lead Actress in a Comedy Series (Applegate, nominated)

Golden Globe Awards
2007: Best Actress - Musical or Comedy Series (Applegate, nominated)
2008: Best Actress - Musical or Comedy Series (Applegate, nominated)

People's Choice Awards
2007: Favorite New Series - Comedy, won
2008: Favorite Television Series - Comedy, nominated
2008: Favorite Female TV Star, Applegate, won

PRISM Awards
2008: Performance in a Comedy Series (Applegate, nominated)
2008: Comedy Episode (for the pilot episode, nominated)

Satellite Awards
2008: Best Actress in a Television Series, Comedy or Musical (Applegate, nominated)

Screen Actors Guild Awards
2008: Outstanding Actress - Comedy Series (Applegate, nominated)
2009: Outstanding Actress - Comedy Series (Applegate, nominated)
2010: Outstanding Actress - Comedy Series (Applegate, nominated)

Teen Choice Awards
2008: Choice TV Actor: Comedy (Barry Watson for playing Todd Deepler, nominated)
2008: Choice TV Actress: Comedy (Applegate, nominated)
2008: Choice TV: Breakout Show, nominated)

Television Critics Association Awards
2008: Individual Achievement in Comedy (Applegate, nominated)

By year

2007
Golden Globe Awards: Best Actress - Musical or Comedy Series (Christina Applegate, nominated)
People's Choice Award: Favorite New Series - Comedy (won)
Screen Actors Guild: Outstanding Actress - Comedy Series (Applegate, nominated)

2008
BMI Film and TV Awards: BMI TV Music Award (Jan Stevens, won)
Emmy Awards: Outstanding Actress - Comedy Series (Applegate, nominated)
Emmy Awards: Outstanding Supporting Actress - Comedy Series (Jean Smart, won)
Golden Globe Awards: Best Actress - Musical or Comedy Series (Applegate, nominated)
People's Choice Awards: Favorite Television Series - Comedy (nominated)
People's Choice Awards: Favorite Female TV Star (Applegate, won)
PRISM Awards: Performance in a Comedy Series (Applegate, nominated)
Prism Awards: Comedy Episode (for "Pilot", nominated)
Satellite Awards: Best Actress in a Television Series, Comedy or Musical (Applegate, nominated)
Screen Actors Guild: Outstanding Actress - Comedy Series (Applegate, nominated)
Teen Choice Awards: Choice TV Actor: Comedy (Barry Watson, nominated)
Teen Choice Awards: Choice TV Actress: Comedy (Applegate, nominated)
Teen Choice Awards: Choice TV: Breakout Show (nominated)
Television Critics Association Awards: Individual Achievement in Comedy (Applegate, nominated)

2009
Emmy Awards: Outstanding Actress - Comedy Series (Applegate, nominated)

Samantha Who?